Shivam Pradhan (died 29 October 2016) was an Indian actor. He established his career in Hindi films, and was one of the popular supporting actors in India.

Early life

Acting career
He started acting in plays from school. In class 11th, he acted in his first play Ashadh Ka Ek Din, written by Mohan Rakesh.

In theater, he acted in various plays, such as the Roman play Peer Gynt in Hindi and Bertolt Brecht's play Mother Courage and Her Children in Hindi (by Neelabh Ashk).

He worked as a dubbing artist for animation series on Hungama and Disney.

He worked in 270 episodes of Pragaya channel's Info-tainment series.

He worked for 13 episodes of Tata Sky's Daily Zindagi ad campaign.

He was the host at the Star Parivaar Awards (2015).

Filmography

Death
He was suffering from a breathing problem during the last 7 years before his death. He died on 29 October 2016.

References

External links 
 

Year of birth missing
2016 deaths
Indian male film actors
Indian male comedians
Male actors in Hindi cinema
20th-century Indian male actors
Male actors from Mumbai